A list of the films produced in Mexico in 1942 (see 1942 in film):

1942

External links

1942
Films
Mexican